René Picado Michalski  (December 28, 1905 – July 12, 1956) was a Costa Rican politician.

Vice presidents of Costa Rica
1905 births
1956 deaths